The 2000 Northern Illinois Huskies football team represented Northern Illinois University as a member of the West Division of the Mid-American Conference (MAC) during the 2000 NCAA Division I-A football season. Led by fifth-year head coach Joe Novak, the Huskies compiled an overall record of 6–5 with a mark of 4–3 in conference play, tying for third place in the MAC's West Division. Northern Illinois played home games at Huskie Stadium in DeKalb, Illinois.

Schedule

References

Northern Illinois
Northern Illinois Huskies football seasons
Northern Illinois Huskies football